Get Nervous is the fourth studio album by American rock singer Pat Benatar, released in October 1982. It debuted on the Billboard 200 album chart the week ending November 20 and peaked at No. 4, staying on the charts for 46 weeks.

Three songs from the album were released as singles: "Shadows of the Night", "Little Too Late", and "Looking for a Stranger" all reached the US Top 40. In 1983, "Shadows of the Night" garnered Benatar her third Grammy Award for Best Female Rock Vocal Performance.

This is the first Pat Benatar album to feature Charlie Giordano on keyboards, as guitarist Scott St. Clair Sheets left after Precious Time was released.

Track listing

Personnel

Musicians
Pat Benatar – lead and backing vocals
Neil Giraldo – guitars, backing vocals, producer
Charlie Giordano – keyboards
Roger Capps – bass, backing vocals
Myron Grombacher – drums

Production
Peter Coleman – producer
Dave Hernandez – assistant engineer
Steve Hall – mastering

Charts

Weekly charts

Year-end charts

Certifications

In popular culture
Alvin and the Chipmunks covered "Anxiety (Get Nervous)" for their 1985 Alvin and the Chipmunks episode "Court Action."
Disney Channel-star Ashley Tisdale recorded a version "Shadows of the Night" for the film Picture This (2008).
R&B vocalist Mary J. Blige sings "Shadows of the Night" in the film Rock of Ages of 2012.

See also
"No Reins" lawsuit

References

External links
"Get Nervous" at discogs

1982 albums
Pat Benatar albums
Chrysalis Records albums